The Palacio de Xifré is a Madrilenian palace now disappeared that was in the Paseo del Prado, at the corner Calle de Lope de Vega, opposite the Prado Museum. It was one of the best examples of Neo-Mudéjar architecture in Madrid and one of the palaces that the Spanish financial elite of the second half of the 19th century had built along the paseos del Prado, Recoletos and la Castellana.

History 

In the 19th century it was in Madrid the called "Barrio de los Banqueros" situated in the zone of the paseos del Prado and Recoletos, Plaza de Cibeles and adjacent streets. It was in this part of the city where took up residence the wealthier families.

It was here that was built the Palace of Xifré Downing (son of Josep Xifré i Casas), which was located in the Paseo del Prado on the corner with Calle Lope de Vega.

The Palace, a small imitation of the Alhambra in Granada, was built by Catalan businessman Jose Xifré Downing between 1862 and 1865. Josep Xifré Downing was heir to a large fortune thanks to his Catalan father, Josep Xifré i Casas, who owned multiple businesses in Cuba, the US and Europe. The son met the architect José Contreras who was then the restorer of the Alhambra. Contreras, was a pioneer of Neo-al-Andalusian architecture and before starting the construction of the Palace, he received a six-month scholarship from Xifré to study the incorporation of the decorations of the Alhambra in his future Palace. In 1857, the financier bought nine sites located between Calle Lope de Vega and Trajineros (current Paseo del Prado) to the Duke of Medinaceli. The area had begun installing the elite members of Madrid. The construction works discoursed between 1858 and 1862.

The missing Palacio de Xifré, was one of the best examples of Madrilenian Neo-Mudéjar architecture. Possibly in its time it was one of the most sumptuous buildings of Madrid. From the outer gate, through the facades and all inside, imitated in a very good way the golden age of the al-Aldalusian architecture.

On the death of Josep Xifré Downing, his son Josep Xifré Hamel. Hamel sold the palace in 1914. The palace became the Delegation of Mexico to own the building, Mexican Ambassador Manuel de Iturbe.

After years of neglect, the building was purchased by the Duke of the Infantado for his own residence. The Duchy of the Infantado is a title granted by the Catholic Monarchs on July 22, 1475 to Diego Hurtado de Mendoza, 2nd Marquis of Santillana.

In 1949, the palace was purchased by a real estate that dropped it a year later to build the building of the National Trade Union Office now the Ministry of Health.

Remains 
Part of the remains of the palace are preserved today as: The facade that was acquired by Arturo Ruiz Piña, to incorporate it into a hotel in the village of Losa de Riofrío, in Castile and León. The beautiful staircase of the Palace went to the town of Chiloeches, in Castilla-La Mancha. The Embassy of France acquired the hardwood floors. The Marquises of Deleitosa bought eaves, decorations for install them on their farm in Salamanca. The central courtyard, with its marble columns, was acquired by José Soto Huerta, for mounting on a farm he owned in the old highway of Barajas. The Directorate General of Architecture bought a number of windows to be deposited at the School of Architecture, but were literally plundered to exception of the bulky parts that with over the years, these are badly damaged.

References

Bibliography

External links 
 Virtual Library of the Community of Madrid: Palacio Xifré. Photo Gallery of the Palace (18..).

Demolished buildings and structures in Madrid
Palaces in Madrid
Paseo del Prado
Neo-Mudéjar architecture in Spain
Buildings and structures completed in 1862
Former palaces in Spain
Moorish Revival palaces
Buildings and structures demolished in 1950
1950 disestablishments in Spain